The 1978 Centennial Cup is the eighth Tier II Junior "A" 1978 ice hockey National Championship for the Canadian Junior A Hockey League.

The Centennial Cup was competed for by the winners of the Abbott Cup/Western Canadian Champions and the Eastern Canadian Jr. A  Champions.

The finals were hosted by the Guelph Platers in the city of Guelph, Ontario.

The Playoffs

Prior to the Regionals
Merritt Centennials (BCJHL) defeated Richmond Sockeyes (PCJHL) 3-games-to-none
Guelph Platers (OPJHL) defeated Degagne Hurricanes (TBJHL) 4-games-to-none
Pembroke Lumber Kings (CJHL) defeated Thetford Mines Fleur de Lys (QJAHL) 4-games-to-none
New Waterford (EJHL) was eliminated in Regionals

MCC Finals

Regional Championships
Manitoba Centennial Cup: Guelph Platers

Abbott Cup: Prince Albert Raiders
Eastern Champions: Guelph Platers

Doyle Cup: Merritt Centennials
Anavet Cup: Prince Albert Raiders
Dudley Hewitt Cup: Guelph Platers
Callaghan Cup: Charlottetown Islanders

Awards
Most Valuable Player: Terry Cullen (Guelph Platers)

All-Star Team
Forward
Terry Cullen (Guelph Platers)
George McPhee (Guelph Platers)
Brad Tippett(Prince Albert Raiders)
Defence
Brian McLellan (Guelph Platers)
Jim Wilson (Guelph Platers)
Goal
Brian Hayward  (Guelph Platers)

Roll of League Champions
AJHL: Calgary Canucks
BCJHL: Nanaimo Clippers
CJHL: Pembroke Lumber Kings
EJHL: New Waterford Jets
IJHL: Charlottetown Eagles
MJHL: Kildonan North Stars
MVJHL: Cole Harbour Colts
NBJHL: Fredericton Red Wings
OPJHL: Guelph Platers
PacJHL: Richmond Sockeyes
QJAHL: Thetford Mines Fleur de Lys
SJHL: Prince Albert Raiders
TBJHL: Degagne Hurricanes

See also
Canadian Junior A Hockey League
Royal Bank Cup
Anavet Cup
Doyle Cup
Dudley Hewitt Cup
Fred Page Cup
Abbott Cup
Mowat Cup

External links
Royal Bank Cup Website

1978
Cup